Ambla was a rural municipality of Estonia, in Järva County.

Populated places

Small boroughs
Aravete - 1003
Ambla - 387
Käravete - 288

Villages
Roosna - 133
Jõgisoo - 111
Kurisoo - 107
Märjandi - 74
Sääsküla - 73
Reinevere - 68
Raka - 65
Kukevere - 49
Mägise - 35
Rava - 30

References

External links
 

 
Former municipalities of Estonia